Troy William Stokes Jr. (born February 2, 1996) is an American professional baseball outfielder for the York Revolution of the Atlantic League of Professional Baseball. He has previously played in Major League Baseball for the Pittsburgh Pirates.

Career

Milwaukee Brewers
Stokes attended Calvert Hall College High School in Baltimore, Maryland. He was drafted by the Milwaukee Brewers in the fourth round of the 2014 Major League Baseball draft.

Stokes signed with Milwaukee and made his professional debut with the Arizona League Brewers, hitting .262 over 47 games. In 2015, he played with the Helena Brewers, slashing .270/.384/.407 with five home runs, 27 RBIs, and 26 stolen bases over 62 games, and in 2016, he played for the Wisconsin Timber Rattlers with whom he hit .268 with four home runs and 29 RBIs in 86 games. Stokes played 2017 with the Carolina Mudcats and Biloxi Shuckers, batting .251 with twenty home runs, 74 RBIs, and 31 stolen bases over 135 total games. He played for Biloxi in 2018, hitting .233 with 19 home runs and 58 RBIs in 129 games, and won a minor league Gold Glove Award. The Brewers added him to their 40-man roster after the 2018 season. On September 1, 2019, Stokes was designated for assignment.

Detroit Tigers
On September 3, 2019, Stokes was claimed off waivers by the Detroit Tigers.

In July 2020, Stokes underwent surgery to repair a broken hamate bone in his hand, and as a result missed the entire 2020 season. On January 5, 2021, Stokes was designated for assignment to clear space for Robbie Grossman on the 40-man roster.

Pittsburgh Pirates
On January 12, 2021, Stokes was claimed off waivers by the Pittsburgh Pirates. On January 24, 2021, Stokes was designated for assignment and was outrighted on January 29.

On May 9, 2021, Stokes was selected to the 40-man roster and promoted to the major leagues for the first time. He made his MLB debut that day as the starting right fielder against the Chicago Cubs. After notching 2 hits in 20 plate appearances, on May 17, 2021, Stokes was designated for assignment following the waiver claim of Ildemaro Vargas. He was outrighted to the Triple-A Indianapolis Indians on May 21.

Milwaukee Brewers (second stint)
On June 25, 2021, Stokes was traded along with Jandel Gustave to the Milwaukee Brewers in exchange for Samuel Escudero. He elected free agency after the season.

York Revolution
On April 4, 2022, Stokes signed with the York Revolution of the Atlantic League of Professional Baseball.

References

External links

1996 births
Living people
African-American baseball players
People from Columbia, Maryland
Baseball players from Maryland
Major League Baseball outfielders
Pittsburgh Pirates players
Helena Brewers players
Wisconsin Timber Rattlers players
Biloxi Shuckers players
Carolina Mudcats players
San Antonio Missions players
Indianapolis Indians players
Arizona League Brewers players
Tigres de Aragua players
American expatriate baseball players in Venezuela
Nashville Sounds players
York Revolution players
21st-century African-American sportspeople
Calvert Hall College High School alumni